John Crosby Jr. (June 29, 1951 – 2017) was an American gymnast. He competed in eight events at the 1972 Summer Olympics.

References

External links
 

1951 births
2017 deaths
American male artistic gymnasts
Olympic gymnasts of the United States
Gymnasts at the 1972 Summer Olympics
Sportspeople from New York City
Pan American Games medalists in gymnastics
Pan American Games gold medalists for the United States
Pan American Games silver medalists for the United States
Pan American Games bronze medalists for the United States
Gymnasts at the 1971 Pan American Games